Elinor Fettiplace (born Elinor Poole, later Elinor Rogers; 1570 – in or after 1647) was an English cookery book writer. Probably born in Pauntley, Gloucestershire into an upper class land-owning farming family, she married into the well-connected Fettiplace family and moved to a manor house in the Vale of White Horse, in what was then Berkshire.

In common with most ladies of the Elizabethan era, Fettiplace wrote a manuscript book, now known under the title Elinor Fettiplace's Receipt Book, with details of recipes for dishes and meals, medical remedies and tips for running the household. She dated the work 1604, but it is possible that she began writing it several years earlier, when she was still living with her mother. The book was passed down through her family, initially to her niece, until it was handed to the husband of the writer Hilary Spurling. Spurling conducted research on Fettiplace's identity and the contents of the book, and published the work in 1986.

Fettiplace's husband died in 1615; she moved back to Gloucestershire and married a local man, Edward Rogers, who died in 1623. She lived until at least 1647.

Life

Elinor Poole was born around 1570, probably at Pauntley, Gloucestershire. Her parents were Henry Poole—later Sir Henry, justice of the peace, Member of Parliament and the High Sheriff of Gloucestershire—and Anne,  Wroughton, of Broad Hinton, Wiltshire. Elinor had two sisters—both younger—Francis and Dorothy, and three brothers, Giles, Devereux and Henry. Devereux, who was probably a year or so older than Elinor, was killed when he was 19, fighting alongside his father in France while under the command of Robert Devereux, 2nd Earl of Essex. The Poole family was a large landowner in the area, with farming area down to Wiltshire, through the Cotswolds, into Berkshire and across approaching Herefordshire. Although the properties were extensive, the Poole family had heavily mortgaged much of their land. The family were well-connected within the upper classes, and Elinor's living relatives included her cousins, the brothers Sir Carew and Sir Walter Raleigh.

In early 1589 Elinor Poole married Richard Fettiplace, of the Fettiplace family, in Berkshire. The marriage introduced Elinor to an ancient Norman family that owned large areas of land in the Vale of White Horse. She came to the marriage with a dowry of £400, a bequest of her grandfather, Sir Giles Poole. According to Hilary Spurling, Fettiplace's biographer, the dowry may have come with conditions that her new in-laws put their finances in order by selling some of their land. The couple had five children—three daughters and two sons—and lived in the manor house at Appleton, Oxfordshire, described as "relatively modest" by Spurling. Two of their daughters died as infants and a third aged 16. It is possible there was a fourth daughter, but the point is unclear. Their son Henry was born in 1602, but nothing more is known about him. Their eldest child John was born in 1590. In 1606 he married his cousin Margaret, and the couple lived at Appleton; they were still resident there the following year when they had a son, Edmund.

On a normal day the manor would provide for between twenty and thirty people, which included the family, but during the seasonal feasts this number could double or triple, with fifty guests needing to be fed twice a day during the Twelve Days of Christmas. Fettiplace had a copy of Charles Estienne's book Countrey Farme, which had been given to her by Sir Henry Danvers; the book provided guidance on garden planning, and advice on growing herbs and vegetables. She spent time in the summer and autumn months preserving food for the winter, with the help of the estate's staff. She would have used her collection of recipes to maintain her status within the higher levels of society, keeping in contact with family and friends by exchanging ideas about cookery.

Fettiplace's husband died in 1615 and it appears she left Appleton Manor, giving advice to her daughter-in-law, Margaret, on how best to run it. After Fettiplace's father died in 1616, he left £500 in his will for her. He was buried in St Kenelm's Church, Sapperton. His ornate tomb shows his son kneeling next to him, and his three daughters, including Fettiplace, kneeling at the front. It is her only known likeness.

Fettiplace returned to within her own family's orbit at Sapperton, and married a man from Gloucester, Edward Rogers, who died in 1623. He was also buried in Sapperton's church. Details of her death are unclear, but it was in or after 1647.

Personality
According to Spurling, the little that is known about Fettiplace's character suggests she was forceful, with a "firm view of her own importance". After her husband died, she continued to use the title of "Ladyship", although not entitled to; she continued the practice even after she married a commoner and he had died. His memorial stone in St Kenelm's Church outlines his status from the view of her importance and ancestry.

Spurling concludes Fettiplace was an "efficient and practised manager" in the way she ran her household and, when her husband was absent, the family estate, was interested in modern cookery, and had a "cautious and considerate approach" to dispensing the medicines she prepared.

Receipt Book

Ladies of the Elizabethan age would often keep manuscript books with details of "receipts" for dishes, meals, medical remedies and tips for running the household. Fettiplace's Receipt Book—bound in leather and written on good quality paper—was signed by Fettiplace and dated 1604. Her manuscript is one of the few such works to survive from that time. The food writer C. Anne Wilson considers it likely that the recipes were collected over several years: the social historian Janet Theophano suggests Fettiplace began writing it under her mother's direction.

In 1647 Fettiplace passed her Receipt Book to her niece and goddaughter, Anne Horner, writing "Thes bock I geve to my deare nees and goddutar Mrs Anne Hornar desyring her to kepe it for my sake: 1647". The work was passed down through the generations until it was given to the husband of Hilary Spurling. She researched the background of the book and Fettiplace, and published the work in 1986. Reviewing the work, the historian A. L. Rowse described it as "a fascinating find" that deserved "to taste of the Victorian Mrs Beeton's success as a best seller".

Elinor Fettiplace's Receipt Book has been organised into twelve chapters by Hilary Spurling, each covering a month. Within the work are recipes for food, remedies for ailments and illnesses and tips for running the household. Appleton estate was largely self-sufficient, and the Receipt Book describes how to make various household products, including perfume, ink, toothpaste, rat poison and weed killer. Fettiplace also describes the methods used to bleach linen or wash delicate fabrics such as gold weave and silks ("To wash gould and coloured silk").

Among her medical remedies, Fettiplace included treatments provided by friends. Sir Walter Raleigh provided a recipe for "Syrup of Tobacco", used to sooth lung trouble, or curing a long-held cough, and "Tobacco Water", and John Hall, a physician and the son-in-law of William Shakespeare, provided a method of stopping nosebleeds. Among the other medicinal entries included in the book, were remedies for a bad back (11), insomnia (7), wound dressing (36), failing eyesight (45), coughs (16), stomach ache (24) and one for the plague. The reference to a plague cure is unsurprising: the disease was rampant in England the early years of the 1600s, including in around Oxfordshire and Berkshire in 1604—the year Fettiplace marked in her book.

In an examination of the recipes in a historical context, Spurling concludes that the recipes were, for the time, modern, and embraced new tastes and styles, rather than the food of the mediaeval past, and which contained elements of a French and English style of cooking that was still running strong 400 years later. Her book contains a recipe for meringues (which she called "White biskit bread"), which pre-dates the appearance in French recipe books in François Massialot's 1692 work Nouvelle instruction pour les confitures.

Most of the recipes for food in the book would have been for produce from Appleton's estate, although there are some imported items for luxury goods. These include in the recipe for "Spanish Marmalad", among the ingredients for which are powdered pearls and gold:

Take five sponfulls of rose water and seaven sponfulls of suger finely beaten, make yt boyle you must have redy by you two handfulls of almondes blanched and finely grownd, with 15 or 16 dates ye stones and whights taken out, and yor dates cut smale and beaten in a morter, then mixe yor dates and almondes well together, then put yt in your Sirrope stirringe yt well together, then take on sponfull of pouder of sinamond, halfe a sponfull of ye pouder of pearles, three sheetes of Golde, stirr all theise well, but you must take yt first from the fire or else yt will bee to stiff that you can-not mingell yt, before yt bee through cold put yt upp into a marmalad boxe.

Elinor Fettiplace's Receipt Book is an important historical work showing what domestic life was like for part of society in Elizabethan England, and the work has been used as a source in several such published works. Few objects other than Fettiplace's manuscript have survived from the Poole's manor at Sapperton.

Notes, references and sources

Notes

References

Sources

External links
 Family tree for Richard Fettiplace in 

English food writers
English women non-fiction writers
People from Gloucestershire
1570s births
1647 deaths
Women cookbook writers
Women food writers
People from Vale of White Horse (district)
People from Cotswold District
History of English cuisine